Alpana Goswami, also known as Alpana Bose Goswami, is an Indian actress who is recognised for her work in Bengali cinema.

Goswami hails from Bandel in Hooghly district. She began her acting career in late 1970s. Her first leading role on silver screen was that in Krishna Sudama (1979). Presently she lives in USA.

Career
Goswami began her acting career after joining in Rammohan Mancha and Bishwarupa. She regularly played in Theatre in Kolkata. Goswami first worked in the film Surya Trishna. She played the lead role in Krishna Sudama in 1979. After releasing the film she became a 1980s celebrated Bengali actress.

Filmography

Hindi film

Bengali film

Bhojpuri Film

References

External links 

 Alpana Goswami – IMDb

Bengali actresses
Indian film actresses
Actresses from West Bengal
People from Hooghly district